Frances Myers (credited as Fran Myers) is an American television soap opera writer and actress. She has written for soaps for nearly 25 years. She also had a contract role on CBS soap opera Guiding Light as Peggy Scott Fletcher from 1965-1980.  She is the widow of actor and writer Roger Newman.  She also had a recurring role on The White Shadow in the latter half of Season 2 as Kathy Plunkett, a dating interest of Coach Ken Reeves (Ken Howard).

References

External links

American soap opera writers
American women television writers
American soap opera actresses
Year of birth missing (living people)
Writers Guild of America Award winners
Living people
Women soap opera writers
21st-century American women